Air Sénégal International was an airline with its head office in Dakar, Senegal. It was a regional carrier operating a scheduled domestic network and regional flights to neighbouring countries. It also operated charter and air taxi flights. Its main base was Dakar-Yoff-Léopold Sédar Senghor International Airport.

On April 24, 2009, the airline suspended all of its operations.

History 
The airline was established on 1 February 1971 as Air Sénégal and started operations on 23 February 2001. It was restructured as an international carrier following the acquisition of a majority stake by Royal Air Maroc in 2001. It was part of Groupe Royal Air Maroc, who owned 51% of the company's shares, with 49% being held by the Senegalese government.

At one time the airline had its head office on the grounds of Dakar-Yoff-Léopold Sédar Senghor International Airport in Yoff, Senegal.

In 2006 the airline disclosed losses of $16 million. In 2007, the Senegalese government stated that effective 5 November 2006, it would purchase a further 26% of the airline, raising its stake to 75%. The Senegalese government stated that support from Royal Air Maroc had "shown its limitations", and that the airline needed to be recapitalised.

In late 2009, a new airline was announced to replace Air Sénégal International. The new airline is called Senegal Airlines with a fleet of 4 Airbus A320 aircraft and 2 Airbus A330 aircraft. Operations commenced in early 2011.

Destinations 

As of 2007, Air Sénégal International operated scheduled passenger flights to the following destinations:

Africa
 Benin
Cotonou - Cadjehoun Airport
 Burkina Faso
Ouagadougou - Ouagadougou Airport
 Cape Verde
Praia - Nelson Mandela International Airport
 Côte d'Ivoire
Abidjan - Port Bouet Airport
 The Gambia
Banjul - Banjul International Airport
 Guinea-Bissau
Bissau - Osvaldo Vieira International Airport
 Guinea
Conakry - Conakry International Airport
 Mali
Bamako - Senou International Airport
 Mauritania
Nouakchott - Nouakchott International Airport
 Niger
Niamey - Diori Hamani International Airport
 Senegal
Cap Skirring - Cap Skirring Airport
Dakar - Dakar-Yoff-Léopold Sédar Senghor International Airport
Saint Louis - Saint Louis Airport
Tambacounda - Tambacounda Airport
Ziguinchor - Ziguinchor Airport
 Togo
Lomé - Tokoin Airport

Europe
 France
Marseille - Marseille Provence Airport
Paris - Orly Airport
 Italy
Milan - Malpensa Airport
 Spain
Gran Canaria - Gran Canaria Airport
Madrid - Barajas Airport

Codeshares 

At May 2007, Air Sénégal International had codeshare agreements with the following airlines:
 Brussels Airlines (Star Alliance)
 Iberia Airlines (Oneworld)
 Royal Air Maroc
 South African Airways (Star Alliance)
 TACV

Fleet 

At March 2008, the Air Sénégal International fleet consisted of the following aircraft:

Previously operated
At August 2006 the airline also operated:
1 Boeing 737-200
1 Boeing 737-500

References

External links

 Air Sénégal International
 Air Sénégal International 
Air Sénégal International Fleet

Defunct airlines of Senegal
Airlines established in 1971
Airlines disestablished in 2009
Royal Air Maroc
Government of Senegal
Senegalese companies established in 1971